Nizhny Karachan is a rural locality (a selo) and the administrative center of Nizhnekarachansky Rural Settlement, Gribanovsky  District, Voronezh Oblast, Russia. The population was 728 as of 2010. There are 47 streets.

Geography 
Nizhny Karachan is located 23 km southwest of Gribanovsky (the district's administrative centre) by road. Sredny Karachan is the nearest rural locality.

References 

Rural localities in Gribanovsky District